Thappu Thanda is a 2017 Tamil-language comedy thriller film written and directed by debutant Srikantan and produced by SathyaMurthi for Clapboard Production. The film features Sathyamurthi and Shwetha Gai in the lead roles, while Mime Gopi, John Vijay, Aathma Patrick and Ajay Ghosh appear in prominent roles. The story revolves around a politician who transfers a huge amount of money to bribe public for votes and a group of small time robbers who plan to loot that money. The film was released across Tamil Nadu on 8 September 2017.

Cast
Sathyamurthi as Vetri
Shweta Gai as Abi
Mime Gopi as Karna
Ajay Ghosh as Miller
John Vijay as Guru
E. Ramdoss as Thiyagu
Aathma Patrick as Kaliya
Krishna Kaanth as Bothx
 Sendrayan as thief intern

Production
The film's director Srikantan was a graduate of Balu Mahendra's film institute "Cinema Pattarai". The film took a year to script and was then shot entirely across Chennai. A further romantic song was shot in the hills of Wagoman, Kerala. The shoot finished with the song "Dooplika Domaari", which featured 40 stunt artists. The film's producer V.SathyaMurthi was cast as the film's lead actor, while an ensemble cast of supporting actors including John Vijay, Mime Gopi and Ajay Ghosh of Visaranai (2016), were also included in the project. Actress Swetha Gai, who had previously appeared in small roles in A. L. Vijay's Idhu Enna Maayam (2015) and Anirudh Ravichander's "Avalukkena" video, was cast in the leading female role. Prior to the release of the film, Srikantan compared Thappu Thanda to the Kamal Haasan-starrer Mumbai Xpress (2005) and Nalan Kumarasamy's Soodhu Kavvum (2013) stating you find the characters are doing something serious on screen but their actions make audiences laugh.

Music

The film's music was composed by Naren Balakumar and the album released on 15 April 2017, featuring five songs and a theme track.

Release
The film was released on 8 September 2017, earning positive reviews. A critic from The Times of India wrote "Thappu Thanda is solidly-made for a debut film, and Srikantan narrates his story with confidence" but "what the film lacks is chutzpah in the filmmaking to dazzle us". Likewise, a critic from The New Indian Express wrote "a thrilling second half saves a dour first" adding "lovely attention to intricate details in the latter half left me wondering if the film’s two halves were made by two different people".

References

External links
 

2017 films
Indian black comedy films
Indian comedy thriller films
2010s Tamil-language films
2017 directorial debut films